Hardwood Acres is an unincorporated community and census-designated place in Benzie County in the U.S. state of Michigan. The population was 432 at the 2010 census.  Hardwood Acres is located within Almira Township.

Geography
Hardwood Acres is located in the eastern part of Almira Township in northeastern Benzie County. The CDP is bordered by the village of Lake Ann to the west and by the Grand Traverse County line to the east. The northern edge of the CDP is formed by Maple Street, and the southern edge by Nofsger Road, Bellows Lake Road, and Serenity Lane.

History
The community of Hardwood Acres was listed as a newly-organized census-designated place for the 2010 census, meaning it now has officially defined boundaries and population statistics for the first time.

Demographics

References

Traverse City micropolitan area
Census-designated places in Michigan
Unincorporated communities in Benzie County, Michigan
Unincorporated communities in Michigan
Census-designated places in Benzie County, Michigan